The 2015 Trust House Women's Tour of New Zealand was the first edition of the revived Women's Tour of New Zealand held in New Zealand, with a UCI rating of 2.2. It was held over 18 to 22 February. The race was won by Tayler Wiles, riding for a United States national team, ahead of her team mates Megan Guarnier and Evelyn Stevens.

Teams

UCI women's teams

Elite teams
DNA Cycling p/b K4
High5 Dream Team
Holden Racing Team
3Sixty Sports
Ramblers Club
Fagan Motors Cycling Team
The Sign Factory

National teams
United States
Australia
New Zealand
Japan

Sources:

Stages

Stage 1
18 February 2015 — Masterton to Masterton, team time trial (TTT)

Stage 2
19 February 2015 — Masterton to Solway,

Stage 3
20 February 2015 — Carrington to Carrington,

Stage 4
21 February 2015 — Masterton to Admiral Hill,

Stage 5
22 February 2015 — Masterton to Masterton,

Classification leadership

References

External links
Official website
Race guide (pdf)

Cycle races in New Zealand
Womens Tour
2015 in women's road cycling